The stripe-billed aracari or stripe-billed araçari (Pteroglossus sanguineus) is a near-passerine bird in the toucan family Ramphastidae. It is found in Colombia, Ecuador, and Panama.

Taxonomy and systematics

The International Ornithological Committee (IOC) and BirdLife International's Handbook of the Birds of the World (HBW) recognize the stripe-billed aracari as a species. However, the South American Classification Committee of the American Ornithological Society and the Clements taxonomy treat it as a subspecies of the collared aracari (P. torquatus).

The stripe-billed aracari is monotypic.

Description

It weighs . Males and females have the same coloration of the bill and plumage but the female's bill is shorter than the male's. The adult's bill has a narrow vertical white line at its base. Its maxilla is yellow with a black stripe along its lower edge and a black culmen. The maxilla has small black and yellowish white notches. The bill's mandible is black. Adults have mostly glossy black upperparts with bright red lower back, rump, and uppertail coverts. Their head, throat, and uppermost breast are greenish black. Their lower breast, belly, and undertail coverts are yellow. The breast has a variable red wash and a black spot in its center; the upper belly is crossed by a narrow red and black band. Their thighs are brown. Juveniles are much duller than adults, with a sooty-black head and chest and brownish olive upperparts. The red rump and yellow underparts are paler, and the breast spot, belly band, and bill pattern are indistinct.)

Distribution and habitat

The stripe-billed aracari is found from Darién Province in eastern Panama south through western Colombia to northwestern Ecuador's Esmeraldas and Imbabura provinces. It inhabits the interior and edges of evergreen primary forest and mature secondary forest and also coffee, cacao, and fruit plantations.

Behavior

Social behavior

Stripe-billed aracaris typically travel in groups of about six to 15 individuals that sometimes include other toucan species. They also roost communally; up to seven may occupy a cavity overnight.

Feeding

The stripe-billed aracari's diet is mostly fruit but it also feeds on large insects, the eggs and nestlings of other birds, and other small vertebrates. It mostly forages from the forest's mid level to the canopy but will feed on fruits in the understory. They glean fruit by stretching from a perch, bending, and even hanging upside down. They regurgitate large fruit seeds which often remain viable.

Breeding

The stripe-billed aracari's breeding season is from December to May. It nests in tree cavities, usually those excavated by large woodpeckers but also natural ones. The clutch size is usually three eggs but can be as large as five. The incubation period is 16 to 17 days and both parents incubate. Fledging occurs 26 to 30 days after hatch. The parents and often up to three other adults provision the nestlings. They are fed mostly with insects when young.

Vocalization

The stripe-billed aracari's usual call is "a loud, arresting, high-pitched, and squeaky 'ksisik' or 'ksiyik!'."

Status

The IUCN has assessed the stripe-billed aracari as being of Least Concern, though its population size is not known and is believed to be decreasing. No immediate threats have been identified. "[A]lthough it tolerates secondary forest, it nonetheless is very susceptible to deforestation".

References

stripe-billed aracari
Birds of the Tumbes-Chocó-Magdalena
stripe-billed aracari
Taxonomy articles created by Polbot